The 2002 Cork Intermediate Hurling Championship was the 93rd staging of the Cork Intermediate Hurling Championship since its establishment by the Cork County Board in 1909. The draw for the 2002 opening round fixtures took place on 9 December 2001. The championship began on 27 April 2002 and ended on 13 October 2002.

On 13 October 2002, Delanys won the championship after a 1-13 to 0-14 defeat of Carrigtwohill in a final replay at Páirc Uí Chaoimh. It remains their only championship title in the grade.

Delanys' John Egan was the championship's top scorer with 0-38.

Team changes

To Championship

Promoted from the Cork Junior A Hurling Championship
 Courcey Rovers

From Championship

Promoted to the Cork Senior Hurling Championship
 Killeagh

Regraded to the South West Junior A Hurling Championship
 Argideen Rangers

Regraded to the Mid Cork Junior A Hurling Championship
 Cloughduv

Results

First round

Second round

Third round

Fourth round

Quarter-finals

Semi-finals

Final

Championship statistics

Top scorers

Overall

In a single game

References

Cork Intermediate Hurling Championship
Cork Intermediate Hurling Championship